Maternity Choices Australia, formerly the Maternity Coalition is an Australian advocacy group which aims to improve the provision of maternity services to parents.  It consists of individuals as well as other non-government organisations.

Philosophy
The Maternity Coalition:

 encourages a woman-centred approach to the birth process;
 regard pregnancy and childbirth as normal physiological processes, not illnesses;
 stresses the social, cultural and psychological factors influencing childbirth;
 supports midwives as the primary caregivers for women in normal birth;
 emphasises women's rights to make informed choices about their caregiver and place of birth;
 promotes continuous assessment and critical evaluation of technologies used in maternity care;
 supports the development of services sensitive to women's varied cultural and physical needs.

Its statement seeking political reform of maternity services is outlined in the National Maternity Action Plan which was prepared by The Maternity Coalition in 2002.

Membership
As an umbrella organization it has institutional members from all States and Territories as well as individuals.
 Friends of the Birth Centre, Canberra
 Friends of the Birth Centre, Mackay
 Australian College of Midwives

Individual founding members include:
 Kerreen Reiger

Presidents

National
 Robyn Payne 1998-2000
 Dr Barbara Vernon 2001 - 2003
 Justine Caines 2003 - 2005
 Leslie Arnott,  2006
 Cas McCulloch, 2007
 Louise Hartley, 2008
 Lisa Metcalfe, 2009-2010
 Ann Catchlove, 2010

Queensland
 Bruce Teakle 2002 - incumbent

ACT
 Ingrid McKenzie 2003 - incumbent

Journal
It publishes a quarterly journal entitled Birth Matters.

References

External links
 Maternity Coalition Website

Child welfare activism
Medical and health organisations based in Queensland
Maternity in Australia